Ouaké  is a town, arrondissement, and commune in the Donga Department of western Benin. The commune covers an area of 663 square kilometres and as of 2013 had a population of 74,289 people.

Ethnic Groups

The Lokpa (or Lukpa) are the predominant ethnic group in Ouake.  Ouake is the primary population center for the Lokpa people in Benin.

References

Arrondissements of Benin
Communes of Benin
Populated places in Benin